The Congo national badminton team represents Republic of the Congo in international team competitions and is controlled by the national governing body for badminton body in the Republic of the Congo, the Congolese Badminton Federation (French: Fédération Congolaise de Badminton; Kongo: Shirikisho laRepubilika ya Kôngo).  The Congolese team competed in the African Badminton Championships once in 2014.

The Congolese team also competed in the African Games in 2011.

Participation in BCA competitions 

Mixed team

Participation in Africa Games

Current squad 

Male players
Gislain Ilouwo
Devins Nestar Mananga Nzoussi
Jordan Oyou
Sanat Michael Souriya Mouanda

Female players
Wivine Moyo Bangudulu
Minelie Kassangoyi
Bztecho Loubaki
Benele Issoko

References 

Badminton
National badminton teams
Badminton in the Republic of the Congo